Zainab Tari Soomro (Sindhi: زينب تاري) ruled as the Queen of Sindh (in modern-day Pakistan) for ten years from 1092 AD until 1102. She was the only queen who had ever ruled Sindh as an absolute ruler.

Life
She was the daughter of the Soomro King Asamuddin Daula Dodo Soomro of the Soomro Dynasty, who ascended the throne of Sindh after the death of his father Asimuddin Bhoongar Soomro in 448 AH or 1064-65 AD with the title Dodo-I. Since no male issue followed her, the King appointed tutors for the Princess who trained her how to rule the Kingdom and defend it from the enemies that had sacked  Mansura.

King Dodo-I ruled Sindh for 15 years. During this period of his rule a son was born to him whom he named Shahabuddin Sanghar.  While Sanghar Soomro was still a minor, Dodo-I abdicated the throne in 1092 AD in favour of his daughter Zainab Tari, to live a retired life. Since the Prince Shahabuddin Sanghar was a minor, the Council of Ministers and Sardars unanimously followed the wishes of their Monarch and crowned Sanghar’s sister Princess Zainab Tari as the sovereign Queen of Sindh.

During the reign of Queen Zainab Tari, no foreign armies invaded Sindh, and the capital city Tharri expanded, and trade with foreign countries increased. After the tenth year of her rule, under rule of succession she declared Sanghar as the king of Sindh. Consequently, Sanghar was crowned as the Sovereign King of Sindh and Queen Tari. retired to lead a family life.

Sources 
 Chronological dictionary of Sindh by M.H. Panhwar. 1983.
 An Illustrated Historical Atlas of Soomra Kingdom by M.H. Panhwar.
 “Tareekh-e-Sindh” (History of Sindh). By Allama Syed Sulleman Nadvi. 1947.
 “Salient Features of the Rule of Soomra Dynasty in Sindh”. Research Article by Qamar Din. M. Hayat Soomro. 2009.

References 

History of Sindh
Queens regnant in Asia
Sindhi people
11th-century women rulers
12th-century women rulers